= LaFayette Cup =

Indiana college football trophy

Lafayette Cup
- Awarded for: Indiana state college football champion
- Country: United States

The LaFayette Cup was a trophy awarded to the college football champion of the U.S. state of Indiana.
